Caoqiao station is a station on Line 10, Line 19 and Daxing Airport Express of the Beijing Subway.

Opening time
The station for Line 10 opened on December 30, 2012.

The station for Daxing Airport Express opened on September 26, 2019.

The station for Line 19 opened on December 31, 2021.

Station layout 
The line 10 and line 19 stations both have underground island platforms, and the Daxing Airport Express station has 2 underground side platforms. The Daxing Airport Express station provides an in-town check-in service for flights departing Beijing Daxing International Airport, with 4 counters in the southwest of Daxing Airport Express concourse. XiamenAir has an individual information desk in the Daxing Airport Express concourse.

Exits

There are seven exits, lettered A, B, E1, E2, F, G, and H. Exits A, E1, F, and G are accessible.

References

Railway stations in China opened in 2012
Beijing Subway stations in Fengtai District